Welcome to Wrexham is an American sports documentary series that premiered on August 24, 2022, on FX. The series documents the events of Welsh association football club Wrexham A.F.C., as told by the club's owners Rob McElhenney and Ryan Reynolds.

Background
In September 2020, American actor Rob McElhenney and Canadian-American actor Ryan Reynolds announced their intention to buy Wrexham A.F.C., a Welsh professional association football club based in the Racecourse Ground in Wrexham, North East Wales in the United Kingdom. The company RR McReynolds was set up by November 2020, and the deal was completed in February 2021. As of the purchase, Wrexham A.F.C. played in the National League, the fifth tier of English football, below the Premier League and the three tiers of the English football league system.

At the time, the non-league football team was described to be "struggling". Following the suspension of the 2019–20 National League in March 2020 after the outbreak of the COVID-19 pandemic in the United Kingdom, Wrexham A.F.C. was said to have furloughed staff and players, and the club was experiencing a "threat to the[ir] continued existence". Prior to the pair's purchase, Wrexham A.F.C. was owned by the Wrexham Supporter's Trust, a fan-operated company, since 2011. The trust approved McElhenney and Reynolds' £2 million takeover by 98.6%. Following the purchase, Wrexham A.F.C.'s Twitter account posted a skit with McElhenney and Reynolds performing a parody advert for Ifor Williams Trailers, then the only sponsor for Wrexham A.F.C. Following the takeover by an intermediary, McElhenney and Reynolds attended their first ever game since becoming the club's new owners at Maidenhead, a 3–2 defeat in October 2021.

Management before 2011 was described to have "mismanaged the club to the point of near collapse", with fans "starting to fall out of love with it". The club was served with a winding-up order in 2011.

The series is said to be inspired by Sunderland 'Til I Die, which prompted McElhenney to be interested in buying an association football club, as well as the influence of Humphrey Ker, who was also interested in purchasing a club. Ker was said to have been always watching association football in the writer's room of McElhenney's show Mythic Quest, causing McElhenney to become interested as well, particularly "the idea of promotion and demotion", which McElhenney said was "incredible to me". McElhenney also joked that he only had "TV money" and needed "superhero, movie star money". Ker described himself as "Rob and Ryan's representative" to the club as the pair's inside operations person.

Synopsis
The series centers on the Hollywood pair's attempts to revive the third-oldest professional association football team in the world, founded in 1864, and how the team has performed under the pair's ownership. The pair have no known experience in managing a sports team. The series would also highlight the pair's hopes in improving the team and bringing positive change to the local Wrexham community.

During and since the takeover, Wrexham has risen in the rankings of the National League. In the 2019–20 National League (prior to any takeover rumors), Wrexham A.F.C. were 20th, and by the 2020–21 season, Wrexham rose to eighth place. In the 2021–22 season, the first under the pair's ownership, Wrexham finished in 2nd. However, despite a successful season, they missed out on promotion to the fourth-tier EFL League Two after being knocked-out in the semi-finals of the promotion play-off and will remain in the fifth-tier National League for the 2022–23 season.

Production
The all-access "fly on the wall" docuseries was first announced by McElhenney and Reynolds on May 18, 2021.

The series is produced by Boardwalk Pictures, the company also behind Last Chance U and Chef's Table. Maximum Effort, a film company founded by Reynolds is also co-producing and marketing the series. FX has commissioned two seasons of the show. McElhenney confirmed plans for a second season, following the full release of the first, on October 13, 2022.

The executive producers of the series were stated to be Rob McElhenney, Ryan Reynolds, Nick Frenkel, John Henion, Andrew Fried, Dane Lillegard, George Dewey and Sarina Roma. Henion was also the showrunner.

Describing the series, Nick Grad, FX Entertainment's original programming president said "Rob and Ryan will take fans inside the sport as never before, pairing their genuine love for the game with the welcome challenge of building on the heritage of this club".

Filming for the docuseries began December 2020, with the film crew appearing alongside the owners' first visit to the team at the Wrexham v. Maidenhead United F.C. match in October 2021.

Writing for Bloomberg, correspondent Alex Webb estimated that the show would bring Reynolds and McElhenney a revenue of £600,000, which would have contributed considerably to the club's budget that year.

Cast
The cast for the series was stated as the following:

 Rob McElhenney – Wrexham AFC co-owner, chairman and executive producer
 Ryan Reynolds – Wrexham AFC co-owner, chairman and executive producer
 Humphrey Ker – Wrexham AFC executive director and consulting producer
 Fleur Robinson – Wrexham AFC chief executive
 Shaun Harvey – Wrexham AFC advisor to the board
 Phil Parkinson – Wrexham AFC manager
 Paul Mullin – Wrexham AFC player
 Jordan Davies – Wrexham AFC player
 Aaron Hayden – Wrexham AFC player
 Ollie Palmer – Wrexham AFC player

Episodes

Season 1

Season 2
A week after the premiere of the first season's final episode, McElhenney and Reynolds confirmed on Twitter that a second season of the series is in the works.

Marketing
In May 2021, an announcement trailer for the series was released onto Reynolds' YouTube channel, titled "Welcome to Wrexham". The roughly 2-minute parody sketch comedy involves McElhenney and Reynolds announcing the docuseries, as well as former BBC News and S4C journalist Maxine Hughes, who acts as a "pretty disgruntled" Welsh language translator for the pair, but adds some "creative" translations to the pair's words.

In December 2021, FX released a video promo for the series, titled "It's Never Sunny in Wrexham". The short 30-second clip involved lookalikes of the It's Always Sunny in Philadelphia cast, including a Danny DeVito lookalike, set inside the Turf Hotel located next to Wrexham A.F.C's Racecourse Ground. In the clip, the lookalike cast looks confusingly at a television screen showing the true cast of the American series starring McElhenney, staring back from their Philadelphia Irish bar. The clip also includes the two owners. The scenes involving the lookalike cast and the two owners were filmed in October 2021 as the two owners visited Wrexham. When the lookalike of Danny DeVito visited Wrexham, he was confused for the real actor.

On July 20, 2022, the official trailer for the program was released. The series' official synopsis read "From Hollywood to Wales, from the pitch to the locker room, the front office to the pub, Welcome to Wrexham will track Rob and Ryan’s crash course in football club ownership and the inextricably connected fates of a team and a town counting on two actors to bring some serious hope and change to a community that could use it".

The Walt Disney Company, which owns FX as well as the sports network ESPN, moved three FA Cup matches involving Wrexham to networks ESPN2 and ESPNews to help promote the series.

Release
In May 2022, it was announced that the first two episodes of the series would premiere on August 24, 2022, in the US on FX. All episodes would become available on FX on Hulu in the US and Disney+ in the UK on August 25, 2022. The series would be composed of 30-minute episodes. The series would also be released in Ireland on the same day and on Disney+ as the UK. Dates for other international releases have yet to be announced but are expected to be on Star+ in Latin America and Disney+ (under the Star banner) in various other territories. It is set to be released as a Star Original outside the United States.

Reception

Audience viewership
According to the streaming aggregator Reelgood, Welcome to Wrexham was the 7th most watched program across all platforms, during the week of September 2, 2022.

Critical response
The review aggregator website Rotten Tomatoes reported an 90% approval rating with an average rating of 7.3/10, based on 30 critic reviews. The website's critics consensus reads, "Plunking two famous funnymen into the unpredictable journey of a sports documentary, Welcome to Wrexham is a calculated gamble that pays off." Metacritic, which uses a weighted average, assigned a score of 75 out of 100 based on 16 critics, indicating "generally favorable reviews."

Accolades 
Welcome to Wrexham won Best Sports Documentary and was nominated for Best Ongoing Documentary Series at the 7th Critics' Choice Documentary Awards. Andrea von Foerster received a nomination for Best Music Supervision for a Docuseries at the 2023 Guild of Music Supervisors Awards.

References

External links
 
 

2020s American documentary television series
2022 American television series debuts
Association football documentary television series
English-language television shows
FX Networks original programming
Television series by 20th Century Fox Television
Television series by 3 Arts Entertainment
Television series by Boardwalk Pictures
Television shows set in Wales
Wrexham A.F.C.